James Wayne Stafford (born January 16, 1944) is an American singer, songwriter, musician, and comedian. While prominent in the 1970s for his recordings "Spiders & Snakes", "Swamp Witch", "Under the Scotsman's Kilt", "My Girl Bill", and "Wildwood Weed", Stafford headlined at his own theater in Branson, Missouri, from 1990 to 2020. Stafford is self-taught on guitar, fiddle, piano, banjo, organ, and harmonica.

Early years
Stafford was raised in Winter Haven, Florida. In high school, he played in a band called the Legends, along with friends Bobby Braddock, Kent LaVoie (also known as Lobo) and Gram Parsons (of the Byrds, and The Flying Burrito Brothers).

Career

Recording history
Stafford's first chart hit was "Swamp Witch", produced by Lobo, which cracked the U.S. top 40 in July 1973. On March 2, 1974, his biggest hit, "Spiders & Snakes", peaked at number three on the Billboard Hot 100 and number 14 in the BBC Top 50 in the UK, selling over two million copies, earning a gold disc by the RIAA that month. Stafford continued to have moderate chart success through most of 1975 with an additional minor hit called "My Girl Bill" which reached number 20 in the BBC Top 50 chart a year earlier in 1974.

Television work
Stafford's first televised appearance was in 1974 on a show called Rock Concert that aired in the United Kingdom.

It featured Valerie Curtin, Richard Stahl, Deborah Allen, Cyndi Wood, and Gallagher, and was co-produced by Tony Scotti. Stafford, Rod Warren, April Kelly, and Pat Proft were among the writers on the series.

In 1976, Stafford guest-starred in two episodes of Gemini Man, which were later combined into a TV movie titled Riding with Death. He also guest-starred in the episode "The Understudy" on The Love Boat.

Stafford appeared numerous times on music specials, variety shows, and talk shows.  He was a frequent guest on The Tonight Show. He co-hosted Those Amazing Animals with Burgess Meredith and Priscilla Presley, from 1980 to 1981, and also hosted 56 episodes of Nashville on the Road.

Stafford was credited with being the supervising writer for The Smothers Brothers Comedy Hour revival show, which aired on CBS in 1988.

Songwriting
Stafford contributed to several movie soundtracks. He received a gold record for his work on the Disney movie The Fox and the Hound. He wrote "Cow Patti" for the Clint Eastwood movie Any Which Way You Can and appeared in the movie. His work has been covered by George Jones and Jerry Reed. His second classical guitar album, Somewhere in Time, appeared in March 2002. His most recent comedy album was Don't Tell Mama I'm a Guitar Picker, She Thinks I'm Just in Jail.  In 2010, he produced and recorded his first Christmas album, A Guitar for Christmas.

Live performances
Stafford operated and performed at the Jim Stafford Theatre in Branson, Missouri, beginning in 1990. His children, Sheaffer and GG, would accompany him on stage. 

The theatre ceased performances in spring 2020, citing the COVID-19 pandemic, with plans to re-open within weeks. However, it was announced in 2021 that the theatre would be razed, and in October 2021 a "pre-demolition auction" of theatre items and personal memorabilia was held and it was expected then that the demolition would take place within 60 days. The famous "guitar neck" in front of the theater, regarded as a beloved Branson landmark, was saved in an effort by preservationists and fans.

Personal life
In the late 1970s, Stafford was married briefly to singer-songwriter Bobbie Gentry, and they have a son, Tyler Gentry Stafford. Stafford was also married to Ann Britt Stafford for 24 years. She co-owned the Jim Stafford Theatre in Branson until December 2013.

Filmography
Gemini Man/Riding with Death (1976) – Buffalo Bill
Any Which Way You Can (1980) – Long John
E.S.P. (1983)
Kid Colter (1984) – Bill Colter
Bloodsuckers from Outer Space (1984) – Buford
Gordy (1995) – Branson performer

Discography

Albums

Singles

References

Bibliography
Roland, Tom. (1998). "Jim Stafford." In The Encyclopedia of Country Music. Paul Kingsbury, Ed. New York: Oxford University Press. p. 500,

External links
 
 

1944 births
American country singer-songwriters
People from Winter Haven, Florida
American male singer-songwriters
Living people
People from Branson, Missouri
Place of birth missing (living people)
Singer-songwriters from Florida
Singer-songwriters from Missouri
Comedians from Missouri
Country musicians from Florida
Country musicians from Missouri